The Central District of Urmia County is in West Azerbaijan province, Iran. At the National Census in 2006, its population was 702,376 in 184,576 households. The following census in 2011 counted 806,861 people in 235,689 households. At the latest census in 2016, the district had 879,709 inhabitants in 264,760 households.

References 

Urmia County

Districts of West Azerbaijan Province

Populated places in West Azerbaijan Province

Populated places in Urmia County